Let it Rock is the eighth studio album by the American hard rock band Great White, released in 1996. It was recorded after their split with long-time manager and co-writer Alan Niven. After the acoustic sound of 1994's Sail Away, the band was determined to return to their hard rock roots.

Track listing 
"My World" (Don Dokken, Matthew Johnson, Mark Kendall, Michael Lardie, Jack Russell) – 5:28
"Lil Mama" (Kendall, Lardie, Russell, Dave Spitz) – 4:27
"Where is the Love" (Lardie, Russell) – 4:22
"Hand on the Trigger" (Lardie, Russell) – 5:17
"Easy" (Kendall, Lardie, Russell) – 4:26
"Pain Overload" (Audie Desbrow, Kendall, Lardie, Russell) – 4:41
"Lives in Chains" (Kendall, Lardie, Russell, Spitz) – 6:20
"Anyway I Can" (Teddy Cook, Desbrow, Kendall, Lardie, Russell) – 6:07
"Man in the Sky" (Todd Griffin, Russell) – 4:38
"Ain't No Way to Treat a Lady" (Floyd D. Rose,  Scott Palmerton) – 2:45
"Miles Away" (Kendall, Lardie, Russell) – 5:32

Japanese edition track listing 
"Lil Mama" – 4:27
"Ain't No Way to Treat a Lady" – 2:45
"My World" – 5:28
"Pain Overload" – 4:41
"Easy" – 4:26
"Lives in Chains" – 6:20
"Man in the Sky" – 4:38
"Hand on the Trigger" – 5:17
"Where Is the Love" – 4:22
"Anyway I Can" – 6:07
"Burnin' House of Love" – 3:52 (bonus track)
"Miles Away" – 5:32

Personnel

Great White 
Jack Russell – lead and backing vocals, producer
Mark Kendall – guitars, backing vocals
Michael Lardie – guitars, keyboards, banjo, flute, backing vocals, producer, engineer
Audie Desbrow – drums

Additional musicians 
Dave Spitz – bass
Cody McDonald – harmonica
Steffen Pressley – alto sax
Alicia Previn a.k.a. Lovely Previn – violin
Don Teschner – viola
Martin Tillman – cello

Production 
Dito Godwin – producer
Ulysses Noriega, Darian Rundall, Stacey Hanlon – assistant engineers
Steve Hall – mastering

References 

Great White albums
1996 albums